Mara! is an Australian world music quintet. They have won 2 ARIA Awards for Best World Music Album in 1996 (Ruino Vino) and 2001 (Live in Europe) and they were also nominated in 2006 (Sorella) and along with the Martenitsa Choir in 1997 (Sezoni).

Members

Members 
 Paul Cutlan - clarinets, saxophones
 Lloyd Swanton - bass
 Sandy Evans - saxophones
 Llew Kiek - guitar, bouzouki, baglama
 Mara Kiek - vocals, percussion

Former members 
 Jim Denley - flute, alto sax
 Michael Haughton - tenor and soprano saxes
 Tony Gorman - clarinet and alto sax
 Steve Elphick - double bass
 Andrew Robson - saxophones

Associate artists 
 Stefan Kozuharov (librettist)
 Silvia Entcheva (vocalist)
 Daniele di Giovanni - engineer
 Guy Dickerson - engineer

Associate artists: Schools performers 
 Tim Clarkson - horns
 Brendan Clarke - double bass
 Dave Ellis - double bass
 Loretta Palmeiro - horns
 Sam Gill - horns

Discography

Albums

Awards and nominations

ARIA Awards 

Mara! have won two ARIA Music Awards from four nominations, all in the same category: Best World Music Album.

|-
| 1996 || Rulno Vlno || Best World Music Album || 
|-
| 1997 || Sezoni (with Martenitsa Choir) || Best World Music Album || 
|-
| 2001 || Live in Europe || Best World Music Album || 
|-
| 2006  || Sorella || Best World Music Album || 
|-

References

External links
Mara!

Australian world music groups
ARIA Award winners